The Sōryū-class submarines (16SS) are diesel-electric attack submarines. The first boat in the class entered service with the Japan Maritime Self-Defense Force in 2009. The Sōryūs have the largest displacement of any submarine used by post-war Japan.

It is Japan's first air-independent propulsion submarine. From Sōryū to Shōryū are fitted with Kockums Naval Solutions Stirling engines license-built by Kawasaki Heavy Industries, allowing them to stay submerged for longer periods of time. Furthermore, Ōryū is the world's first lithium-ion battery submarine. The cost of the sixth submarine (Kokuryū) was estimated at 540 million USD.

In 2019, the replacement to the Sōryūs, the Taigei-class submarine, entered the planning phase.

Naming convention
Japanese submarines since World War II were named after ocean currents. The JMSDF changed its naming convention with the Sōryū, and submarines will now be named after mythological creatures. Sōryū (そうりゅう) means blue dragon in Japanese and shares its name with the World War II aircraft carrier , sunk during the Battle of Midway.

Variants

The eleventh Sōryū-class submarine (Ōryū) is the first Japanese submarine in the fleet to mount lithium-ion batteries. The JS Ōryū was given a budget of  under the 2015 Japanese Defense Budget. 

Lithium-ion batteries have almost double the electric storage capacity of traditional lead-acid batteries, and by not only replacing them in the existing battery storage areas but adding to the already large battery capacity by also filling the huge space (several hundred tons displacement) inside the hull previously occupied by the AIP Stirling engines and their fuel tanks with these new batteries, the amount of (more powerful) batteries carried overall is massive. This has improved the underwater endurance significantly and is felt will be an advantage over the slow recharge capability of the AIP system. 

In any event, JMSDF believes that lithium-ion is the way forward and intends to 'trial' this new system and compare it to the previous AIP system for operational effectiveness.

Exports
On 9 April 2014, then-Australian Minister for Defence, David Johnston, described the Sōryū class as "extremely impressive" while discussing Australia's future submarine options. On 26 April 2016, Australian Prime Minister Malcolm Turnbull announced that the Australian contract had been awarded to the French-designed Shortfin Barracuda, though this deal was eventually rescinded.

India, Morocco, Norway, Netherlands, and Taiwan have also approached Japan, and expressed an interest in buying Sōryū-class submarines. During a visit to Japan, India's then-Union Minister of Defence, Manohar Parrikar, invited the Japanese government to participate in their USD$8.1 billion Project 75I-class submarine procurement program.

Boats

See also
 List of submarine classes in service

Submarines of similar comparison
 Type 212 submarine - A class of diesel-electric attack-submarines developed by ThyssenKrupp Marine Systems and exclusively built for the German Navy, the Italian Navy and the Royal Norwegian Navy.
 Type 214 submarine - A class of export-oriented diesel-electric attack-submarines, also developed by ThyssenKrupp Marine Systems and currently operated by the Hellenic Navy, the Portuguese Navy, the Republic of Korea Navy and the Turkish Naval Forces.
 Type 218SG submarine - A class of extensively-customised diesel-electric attack-submarines developed by ThyssenKrupp Marine Systems and currently operated by the Republic of Singapore Navy.
  - A class of extensively-customised diesel-electric attack-submarines developed by ThyssenKrupp Marine Systems and currently operated by Israel.
  - A unique class of  diesel-electric attack-submarines developed by ThyssenKrupp Marine Systems and currently being built for Israel.
  - A class of export-oriented diesel-electric attack-submarines, jointly developed by Naval Group and Navantia and currently operated by the Chilean Navy, the Royal Malaysian Navy, the Indian Navy and the Brazilian Navy.
 S-80 Plus submarine - A class of conventionally-powered attack-submarines, currently being built by Navantia for the Spanish Navy.
 Blekinge-class submarine is a class of submarine developed by Kockums for the Swedish Navy
 KSS-III submarine - A class of diesel-electric attack submarines, built by Daewoo Shipbuilding & Marine Engineering and Hyundai Heavy Industries and operated by the Republic of Korea Navy.
  - A class of diesel-electric attack submarines currently being built by Mitsubishi Heavy Industries and Kawasaki Heavy Industries for the Japan Maritime Self-Defense Force
 Type 039A submarine - A class of diesel-electric attack-submarines operated by the People's Liberation Army Navy (China) and being built for the navies of the Royal Thai Navy and the Pakistan Navy.
  - A class of diesel-electric attack-submarines being built for the Russian Navy.

References

External links

Japanese website with Diagram
Globalsecurity.org
Military-today.com
Soryu Class 16SS SSK Submarine - Japan Maritime Self-Defense Force on navyrecognition.com
Sōryū class Image Gallery
Website on the Imperial Japanese Navy: JMSDF vessels
SWZmaritime December 2020, Japan special

Submarine classes
 
 
Mitsubishi Heavy Industries submarines